The Call of Egypt is an electoral alliance in Egypt that competed in the 2015 Egyptian parliamentary election. The coalition has accused the Nour Party of cooperating with NDP-era tycoon Ahmed Ezz in the run up to the 2015 Egyptian parliamentary election, though the Nour Party has denied the claim. The Revolutionary Guards Party, after initially joining the alliance in February 2015, decided to run for the election on its own. The coalition is seen as being supportive of current president Abdel Fattah el-Sisi.

Affiliated parties 
 Human Rights and Citizenship Party
 We Are the People Party
 Egyptian Revolution Party
 New Independent Party
 Arab Party for Justice and Equality
 Homeland Defenders Party

References

External links

2014 establishments in Egypt
Political party alliances in Egypt